Sveshnikov is a surname. Notable people with the surname include:

Aleksei Georgievich Sveshnikov (1924–2022), Russian mathematical physicist
Evgeny Sveshnikov (1950–2021), Latvian, former Soviet International Grandmaster of chess and chess writer
German Sveshnikov (1937–2003), Soviet fencer
Boris Sveshnikov (1927–1998), Russian, Soviet non-conformist painter